Pycnocomeae is a tribe of plant of the family Euphorbiaceae. It comprises 2 subtribes and 7 genera.

See also
 Taxonomy of the Euphorbiaceae

References

 
Euphorbiaceae tribes